During the 1926–27 English football season, Brentford competed in the Football League Third Division South. In Harry Curtis' first season as manager, the club finished 11th and advanced to the fifth round of the FA Cup for the first time.

Season summary

After just one top-half finish in the Third Division South since entering the Football League in 1920, Brentford appointed former Gillingham manager Harry Curtis to the position on a one-year contract in May 1926. The club was still seeking a winning formula, after generally poor league placings from previous managers Fred Halliday and Archie Mitchell. The directors of the club cleared the decks and retained just 9 of the previous season's squad. Curtis brought with him assistant trainer Jack Cartmell (an ex-Brentford player) and five Gillingham players – full backs Wally Barnard and Charlie Butler, half back Charlie Reddock and forwards Bill Berry and Joe Craddock. Former Gillingham half back Frank Marshall later signed in January 1927. Jim Ferguson replaced the departed John Thomson in goal and defenders John Hodgson, Ted Winship, half backs Bert Bellamy, Joe Hodnett and forwards George Anderson and Stephen Dearn were also signed.

A 4–0 victory over Brighton & Hove Albion on the opening day put Brentford at the top of the Third Division South table, which was the first time since joining the Football League that the club had occupied the top spot in the division. Defeat in the following match to Luton Town dropped the Bees back to 6th, but three successive wins in the following matches saw the club rise back to the top and they stayed there until 15 September. 10 goals in the first 9 matches from Ernie Watkins was a factor in the bright start. By early December, the team's league form was affected by a fixture pile-up, caused by a run to the fifth round of the FA Cup. The 8 FA Cup matches played in a single season is the most ever by the club. The run was a financial success and generated enough money for the club to build a new grandstand on the Braemar Road side of Griffin Park.

A goal drought suffered by forwards Ernie Watkins, Jack Lane, Stephen Dearn and the departure of Jack Allen to The Wednesday in March 1927 saw Brentford limp through the final three months of the season. The Bees finished the season in 11th place and had been rooted in mid-table since 5 February 1927. Ernie Watkins top-scored with 24 goals, then the highest tally for a Brentford player since the club joined the Football League. Four consecutive home league draws between 2 and 30 April 1927 equalled the club record.

A notable departure after the season was that of 38-year old cricketer Patsy Hendren, who had played intermittently as an outside forward for Brentford since 1907. During the season he had become the first Bees player since the club joined the Football League to score four goals in a match (during a 7–3 rout of Coventry City on 23 October 1926) and an 11,000 crowd turned up to see his final match against Newport County on Easter Saturday 1927. Upon his departure, Hendren's 400-plus Brentford appearances was then the club record and he was posthumously inducted into the club's Hall of Fame in May 2015.

League table

Results
Brentford's goal tally listed first.

Legend

Football League Third Division South

FA Cup

 Sources: Statto, 11v11, 100 Years of Brentford

Playing squad 
Players' ages are as of the opening day of the 1926–27 season.

 Sources: 100 Years of Brentford, Timeless Bees, Football League Players' Records 1888 to 1939

Coaching staff

Statistics

Appearances and goals

Players listed in italics left the club mid-season.
Source: 100 Years of Brentford

Goalscorers 

Players listed in italics left the club mid-season.
Source: 100 Years of Brentford

Management

Summary

Transfers & loans 
Cricketers are not included in this list.

References 

Brentford F.C. seasons
Brentford